Ceromitia chrysomitra is a moth of the  family Adelidae or fairy longhorn moths. It was described by Edward Meyrick in 1937. It is found in Uganda and Kenya.

References

Moths described in 1937
Adelidae